Great Buddha, Big Buddha, or Giant Buddha may refer to:

China 
 Leshan Giant Buddha in Leshan, Sichuan
 Rongxian Giant Buddha in Rongxian, Sichuan 
 Grand Buddha at Ling Shan, in Wuxi, Jiangsu
 Tian Tan Buddha, or "Big Buddha", Ngong Ping, Lantau Island, Hong Kong
 Spring Temple Buddha, Lushan County, Henan

Japan 
 Daibutsu (the Great Buddha), name given to several large Buddha statues in Japan
 Gifu Great Buddha, Shōhō-ji in Gifu Prefecture
 Kamagaya Great Buddha, Kamagaya, Chiba Prefecture
 Daibutsu (Great Buddha) at Kōtoku-in, Kamakura, Kanagawa Prefecture
 Great Buddha at Takaoka, Toyama Prefecture
 Great Buddha at Tōdai-ji, Nara Prefecture
 Ushiku Daibutsu in Ushiku, Ibaraki Prefecture, Japan

Thailand 
 Wat Pho, the Temple of the Reclining Buddha, Bangkok
 Great Buddha of Thailand, Wat Muang Monastery, Ang Thong province (The tallest statue in Thailand)
 Luangpho Yai Great Buddha, Roi Et (2nd-tallest)
 Big Buddha Temple, Ko Phan, Ko Samui
 Wat Intharavihan, home to the tallest statue in Bangkok, Luang Pho To
 Tiger Cave Temple, overlooking Krabi

Others 
 Laykyun Sekkya, Myanmar
 Buddhas of Bamyan in Bamyan, Afghanistan
 Great Buddha (Bodh Gaya), India
 The Great Buddha (painting), 1899 painting by Gauguin

Films 
 The Great Buddha+, a 2017 black comedy submitted to the 91st Academy Awards for Best Foreign Language Film